Květa Peschke and Rennae Stubbs were the defending champions and first seed, but Anna-Lena Grönefeld and Patty Schnyder, who entered the tournament with a wild card, defeated them 6–2, 6–4, in the final.

Seeds

Draw

Draw

External links
Draw

Doubles
Porsche Tennis Grand Prix